Janelle and Janel are surnames. Those bearing them include:

 Emil Janel (1897–1981), Swedish-born American artist
 Richard Janelle (born 1947), Canadian politician
 Al Janelle (born  1990), musician in September Hase